The surface-to-surface intersection (SSI) need. is a basic workflow in computer-aided geometric design: Given two intersecting surfaces in R3, compute all parts of the intersection curve. If two surfaces intersect, the result will be a set of isolated points, a set of curves, a set of overlapping surfaces, or any combination of these cases. Because exact solutions can be found only for some special surface classes, approximation methods must be used for the general case.

References

External links
Surface-to-surface intersections (N.M. Patrikalakis)

Further reading
Ernst Huber, Intersecting General Parametric Surfaces Using Bounding Volumes, Tenth Canadian Conference on Computational Geometry - CCCG'98,1998.
Ernst Huber, Surface-to-surface intersection based on triangular parameter domain subdivision, Proceedings of the 11th Canadian Conference on Computational Geometry, UBC, Vancouver, British Columbia, Canada, August 15–18, 1999
Handbook of Computer Aided Geometric Design, By Gerald E. Farin, Josef Hoschek, Myung-Soo Kim, Published by Elsevier, 2002, 

Geometric algorithms
Geometric intersection
Computer-aided design